When goods are imported into a European Union country from a non-EU territory, those goods may be subject to customs duty, excise duty and value-added tax.

Value-added tax is an EU tax adopted by the member states of the European Union. However, an optional exception is allowed on low value shipments to member states in the form of an EU administrative VAT relief, known as Low Value Consignment Relief or LVCR. It is governed by the EU Council Directive 2009/132/EC.

LVCR is an optional form of VAT relief designed to speed up the transit of low value goods through the mail which might otherwise be delayed by customs and also to reduce the cost of tax collection where it might not be practicable. Member states, if they decide to allow this relief, can set it at a maximum limit of between €10 and €22, but must ensure that it is applied in a way that does not cause competitive distortion or allow VAT abuse. After the Brexit transition period, the UK withdrew LVCR meaning that all imports to the UK have attracted VAT regardless of their value since 1 January 2021. The European Union is expected to implement similar changes from 1st July 2021.

An example of the use of LCVR was found in the LVCR allowed by the UK on shipments originating from the Channel Islands. While this was in place the rate of UK domestic VAT went unchanged and this allowed internet order fulfillment centres to appear in the Channel Islands for packages under £18 (€22). In 2011 the UK Treasury announced that from 1 April 2012, LVCR would no longer apply to goods imported to the UK from the Channel Islands. It was announced on 4 October 2012 that Condor Logistics would close its operations with the loss of about 180 jobs (110 in the UK, 50 in Jersey and 20 in Guernsey). The closure was blamed on changes to LVCR affecting the Channel Islands. In August 2013, Huelin-Renouf, which had operated a lift-on/lift-off container service for 80 years between the Port of Southampton and the Port of Jersey, ceased trading, although the business was later taken up by a market entrant, Channel Island Lines.

See also
 European Union value-added tax
 VAT-free imports from the Channel Islands

References

Value added taxes